Kedar Prasad Ghimire is a Nepalese comedian, actor, scriptwriter, and film producer known for his work in the Nepali entertainment industry. He is widely famous and commonly known as Magne Budo from his hit TV Show, Meri Bassai.

Early life 
Ghimire's mother left his family when he was 7 years old. In 1992, Ghimire wanted to go to Kathmandu for higher study, but his house caught fire, and with it 96,000 rupees was also burnt. That was the only savings his family had. After this incidence, he had no money to study in Kathmandu. He ended up going to Kathmandu anyway, but to work. His uncle used to live there, who stopped him from working; he let him study instead. He studied law, but gave up on it shortly after because he could not pass. He also worked as a labor on construction work. He did many other similar jobs, but never found success in it. He couldn't survive with any of those jobs. In 2005, he finally saw success when he started his career as an actor for popular television program, Meri Bassai.

Career
Ghimire is the script writer, actor and producer of the famous Nepali sitcom Meri Bassai. He plays a role of Magne Budho and he is popular with his dialogue "Ahile latta le diyera bari ko pata ma purydinchu" which literally means "with one kick I will throw you on the edge of field". 
He has also sung two songs which are based on the politics of Nepal. Among them one is "Loktantra Ganatantra" which is broadcast in his show Meri Bassai. 
Kedar Ghimire has also acted in a comedy Nepali hit movies like Cha Ekan Cha in 2013 and Oda no Cha in 2015. With Chhakka Panja becoming the biggest blockbuster in Nepali movie industry. He was working in TV sitcom Meri Bassai as Magne budo, which he left in 2015. He is currently working on Nepali comedy web series Khas Khus. He had also acted in other famous TV serials like Tito Satya, Jire Khursani with TV comedians like Deepak Raj Giri, Sitaram Kattel, Neeta Dhungana, Jeetu Nepal. He also owns a youtube channel named after his deceased mother "Aama Agnikumari Media" since 2014.

Filmography

Films

Television

Discography

Awards

References

External links 
 

1974 births
21st-century Nepalese male singers
21st-century Nepalese screenwriters
Living people
Nepalese male actors
Nepalese male comedians
Nepalese male film actors
Nepalese playback singers
Nepalese screenwriters
Nepalese television actors
Nepalese television directors
Nepali film award winners
People from Makwanpur District
Khas people